Roberto De Zerbi (born 6 June 1979) is an Italian professional football coach and former player who is the head coach of  club Brighton & Hove Albion.

Playing career
De Zerbi started his professional career at AC Milan. He spent four seasons on loan to lower divisions clubs (Serie B to Serie C2). He spent 1999–2000 Serie C1 season in Como along with Alberto Comazzi and Luca Saudati of Milan. Half of the registration rights also sold to Salernitana in 2000–01 and 2001–02 season. In June 2002 Milan bought back De Zerbi from Salernitana and sold De Zerbi to U.S. Foggia.

De Zerbi signed for Serie A side Napoli from Catania for €2.5 million in 2006.

On 8 February 2010, Napoli announced his loan transfer to Romanian Liga I club CFR Cluj, with the deal being made permanent on 31 August 2010 on a three-year contract.

Coaching career

Palermo
On 6 September 2016, De Zerbi was named head coach of Serie A club Palermo following Davide Ballardini's departure by mutual consent due to disagreements with the board. His stint at the helm of the Sicilians however turned out to be negative, with seven consecutive defeats and no points at home in three months. After a penalty shootout elimination in a home match against Serie B club Spezia, De Zerbi was sacked on 30 November 2016 and replaced with former team captain Eugenio Corini.

Benevento
On 23 October 2017, De Zerbi was named head coach of 2017–18 Serie A newcomers Benevento. Despite the side being relegated back to Serie B at the end of the season, De Zerbi was praised for his possession-based, attacking football and transfer business.

Sassuolo
On 13 June 2018, De Zerbi was appointed manager of Sassuolo. Under his tenure, Sassuolo were praised for their footballing style coupled with overachieving results, which led the small Emilia based club, to two consecutive eighth place spots in the Italian top flight, missing out on UEFA Conference League qualification to Roma, only due to goal difference, at the end of the 2020–21 Serie A season.

In May 2021 De Zerbi announced he would leave Sassuolo at the end of the season.

Shakhtar Donetsk
On 25 May 2021, De Zerbi was announced as the new head coach of Ukrainian Premier League club Shakhtar Donetsk. On 22 September he won the 2021 Ukrainian Super Cup against Dynamo Kyiv at the Olympic Stadium in Kyiv, becoming the first Italian manager to win the title. He left the club in July 2022 as a result of the Russian invasion of Ukraine. He managed to leave the club at the top of the UPL during the unfinished season.

Brighton & Hove Albion
De Zerbi was confirmed as the new head coach of Premier League side Brighton & Hove Albion on 18 September 2022, signing a four-year contract. He managed his first game in England on 1 October, in a 3–3 away draw at Liverpool with Leandro Trossard becoming the first Brighton player to score a Premier League hat-trick. De Zerbi lost his first game at Brighton's home stadium of Falmer Stadium on 9 October, calling his players "fantastic" despite the 1–0 defeat to Tottenham Hotspur. He claimed his first win on 29 October, against the manager he replaced in Graham Potter, thrashing his Chelsea team 4–1. De Zerbi went three games unbeaten against Liverpool in his debut campaign at Brighton, including beating them as defending champions in the FA Cup fourth round on 29 January 2023. On 18 February, he was sent off in the tunnel by referee Darren England following Brighton's 1–0 home defeat against Fulham. De Zerbi was shown the red card for complaining he had lost time to prepare for the match due to a meeting about refereeing during the week. In a post-match interview he said the "level of refereeing in the Premier League is very bad," whilst also criticising Darren England saying that he "wasn't in [a] good attitude." On March 3, he was banned from the touchline for one game and fined £15,000 by the FA in the wake of his red card in the Fulham game.

Managerial statistics

Honours

Player
CFR Cluj
 Liga I: 2009–10, 2011–12
 Romanian Cup: 2009–10

Manager
Foggia
 Coppa Italia Lega Pro: 2015–16

Shakhtar Donetsk
 Ukrainian Super Cup: 2021

References

External links

 

1979 births
Living people
Footballers from Brescia
Italian footballers
Italian football managers
Calcio Foggia 1920 managers
Palermo F.C. managers
Benevento Calcio managers
U.S. Sassuolo Calcio managers
FC Shakhtar Donetsk managers
Association football midfielders
Association football forwards
Italian expatriate footballers
Catania S.S.D. players
A.C. Milan players
Calcio Padova players
A.C. Monza players
S.S.C. Napoli players
U.S. Avellino 1912 players
Como 1907 players
Calcio Lecco 1912 players
Calcio Foggia 1920 players
S.S. Arezzo players
CFR Cluj players
Liga I players
Expatriate footballers in Romania
Serie A players
Serie B players
Serie C players
Serie D players
Serie A managers
Ukrainian Premier League managers
Italian expatriate football managers
Expatriate football managers in Romania
Expatriate football managers in Ukraine
Expatriate football managers in England
Italian expatriate sportspeople in Romania
Italian expatriate sportspeople in Ukraine
Italian expatriate sportspeople in England